United Nations Security Council Resolution 228, adopted on November 25, 1966, after hearing statements from representatives of Jordan and Israel as well as a report from the Secretary-General U Thant concerning the military action, the Council observed that this incident constituted a large-scale and carefully planned military action against Jordanian territory by the armed forces of Israel.

The Council deplored the loss of life and property and censured Israel for this violation of the United Nations Charter and of the General Armistice Agreement.  The Council emphasized to Israel that actions of military reprisal cannot be tolerated and that if they are repeated the Council would have to consider further and more effective steps to ensure against them.

The resolution passed with 14 votes to none, with one abstention from New Zealand.

See also
List of United Nations Security Council Resolutions 201 to 300 (1965–1971)
The Samu Incident

References
Text of the Resolution at undocs.org

External links
 

 0228
 0228
1966 in Israel
 0228
November 1966 events